Nding may be,

the extinct Nding language of Sudan
the Congolese Henri Nding